Kenosha Pass, elevation , is a high mountain pass located in the Rocky Mountains of central Colorado in the United States.

The pass is located in the Rocky Mountains southwest of Denver, Colorado, just northeast of the town of Fairplay, Colorado. Geologically, the pass is located atop a large granite batholith (known as the Kenosha Batholith) that forms the spine of the Front Range along the eastern side of South Park.  It is traversed by  US 285 between Jefferson and Grant, and provides a route between the valley of the North Fork South Platte River and the headwaters of the South Platte River in South Park.  In addition to providing one of the principal access routes to South Park, the pass offers dramatic views of the surrounding Rockies, including the nearby peaks of Mount Evans and Mount Bierstadt.

Description
The pass is easily traversable by most vehicles, never reaching above the treeline and featuring easily  negotiable curves along an amply wide highway.  The approach on the eastern side is fairly gentle, ascending from near Grant up a gulch at the headwaters of the North Fork. The western side of the pass has a steeper ascent, winding up the flank of a mountainside east of the town of Jefferson. An overlook on the west side of the pass offers a panoramic view of South Park. The top of the pass is nearly flat and surrounded by the Pike National Forest, with a United States Forest Service campground on the summit.

The pass was used by Ute bands to reach the hunting grounds of South Park. In the 19th century the pass was used by white trappers to traverse the Front Range. During the Pike's Peak Gold Rush of the 1860s the pass was heavily used by prospectors eager to reach the placer gold fields at the headwaters of the South Platte near Fairplay and other South Park mining communities. The increase in traffic led to the widening of the trail into a wagon road; during the Colorado Silver Boom the pass became one of the main routes of entry for eager immigrants to Leadville, Breckenridge, and Aspen.

The Colorado Trail crosses the summit of Kenosha Pass. The trail portion near the campground and heading northwest is popular with mountain bike enthusiasts and hikers.

In 1879 the pass was traversed by the narrow gauge Denver, South Park and Pacific Railroad, and later the Colorado and Southern Railway, providing the first rail link between Denver and the South Park mining communities such as Fairplay (the tracks were removed in 1938, but the modern highway follows the old road and the railroad route over the pass - most of which is still visible). During this same year of 1879, the poet Walt Whitman crossed the pass and described its summit with these words, later published in Specimen Days:

I jot these lines literally at Kenosha summit, where we return, afternoon, and take a long rest, 10,000 feet above sea-level. At this immense height the South Park stretches fifty miles before me. Mountainous chains and peaks in every variety of perspective, every hue of vista, fringe the view...so the whole Western world is, in a sense, but an expansion of these mountains.
On July 25th, 1936, Denver and Rio Grande Western locomotive #346, which was on loan to the Colorado and Southern at the time, rolled on the east side of the pass as it hit a corner at an estimated speed of ~40 mph. The engineer at the throttle, Eugene K. McGowan, was killed in the wreck.

Popular culture

In the South Park episode "The Return of the Fellowship of the Ring to the Two Towers" a sign for Kenosha Pass can be seen as the boys walk from South Park to Conifer to the video store. In the episode "Prehistoric Ice Man," a man who has been frozen since 1996 goes back to his wife, and he says he was lost on Kenosha Pass.

In South Park: Post Covid, a sign shows saying "Kenosha Pass: Now OPEN due to Global Warming" as Stan returns to South Park. 

A line from Thomas Pynchon's novel Gravity's Rainbow:
you never danced the kenosha kid
is repeated throughout, with varying punctuation and capitalization,
changing the meaning of the sentence each time.

References

Rail mountain passes of the United States
Denver, South Park and Pacific Railroad
Mountain passes of Colorado
Landforms of Park County, Colorado
Transportation in Park County, Colorado